George W. White (born c. 1841) was a state legislator in Mississippi. He served in the Mississippi House of Representatives from 1870 to 1873 and Mississippi Senate from 1874 to 1877. White was born in Mississippi. He represented Wilkinson County, Mississippi.

See also
African-American officeholders during and following the Reconstruction era

References

1840s births
Year of birth uncertain
Year of death missing
Members of the Mississippi House of Representatives
Mississippi state senators
19th-century American politicians
People from Wilkinson County, Mississippi